Ruby Storm (born 18 November 2003) is an Australian Paralympic swimmer with an intellectual disability. She represented Australia at the 2019 World Para Swimming Championships, winning a bronze medal, and at the 2020 Tokyo Paralympics, she won a silver and bronze medal.

Personal
Storm was born on 18 November 2003 and grew up in Traralgon, Victoria. She has indigenous heritage.

Swimming career
As a child Storm was scared of the water but she learnt to swim by observing her older sister. She is classified as an S14 swimmer. She smashed records at the 2018 Para Pan Pac trials in winning the 200m freestyle event. At the 2019 World Para Swimming Championships, London, she was a member of the Australian team that won the bronze medal in the Mixed 4 × 100 m Freestyle Relay S14. She also competed in the Women's 200m Freestyle S14, Women's 100m Breaststroke SB14, Women's 200m Individual Medley SM14 and Women's 100m Butterfly S14.

At the 2020 Summer Paralympics, Storm teamed up with Madeleine McTernan, Ricky Betar and Benjamin Hance in the  Mixed 4 x 100 m freestyle S14. They won the silver medal with a time of 3:46.38, just under 6 seconds behind the winners, Great Britain, who set a world record. She also won the bronze medal in the Women's 100 m butterfly S14 with a time of 1:06.50, just under 3 seconds slower that Valeriia Shabalina of RPC who broke the world record. In second place was another Australian Paige Leonhardt. She made three other individual finals. 

Storm won the silver medal in the Mixed 4 x 100 m Freestyle S14 at the 2022 World Para Swimming Championships, Madeira. She did not medal in three other events.

At the 2022 Commonwealth Games, Birmingham, England, she finished 6th in the Women's 100 m freestyle S14.

Storm was coached by Deen Gooch in Traralgon but, as of 2021, is coached by Nathan Doyle at USC Spartans.

Recognition
2018 – Junior Annual Gippstar Winner

References

External links
 
 
 

2003 births
Living people
Intellectual Disability category Paralympic competitors
Female Paralympic swimmers of Australia
S14-classified Paralympic swimmers
Sportspeople with intellectual disability
Medalists at the World Para Swimming Championships
 Indigenous Australian Paralympians
Medalists at the 2020 Summer Paralympics
Swimmers at the 2020 Summer Paralympics
Swimmers at the 2022 Commonwealth Games
Paralympic bronze medalists for Australia
Paralympic medalists in swimming
Australian female freestyle swimmers
Australian female breaststroke swimmers
Australian female butterfly swimmers
Australian female medley swimmers
21st-century Australian women